Sein Myint is a Burmese politician and former political prisoner. In the 1990 Burmese general election, he was elected as an Pyithu Hluttaw member of parliament, winning a majority of 28,259 (55% of the votes), but was never allowed to assume his seat.

In 1980, he obtained a medical degree (MBBS) from the Rangoon Institute of Medicine and ran a private clinic from 1981 to 1989.

From 9 August to 30 October 1989, he was sentenced to the Bassein prison under the 1975 State Protection Act's Article 10a, for his involvement in organizing a trip by Aung San Suu Kyi to the Irrawaddy Division. From November 1991 to January 1992, he was arrested for allegedly participating in the Karen National Union's underground movement.

References

National League for Democracy politicians
Prisoners and detainees of Myanmar
1954 births
Living people
People from Ayeyarwady Region
Burmese physicians
University of Medicine 1, Yangon alumni